Too Much Information is the fifth studio album by English indie rock band Maxïmo Park. It was released on 3 February 2014 through Daylighting in the UK and Vertigo elsewhere in Europe. The track "Brain Cells" was released to radio stations as a promotional single in late 2013, followed by physical releases of singles "Leave This Island" and "Midnight On The Hill". "Give, Get, Take" was eventually released as a digital single at the end of 2014.

Album information
The bulk of the album was recorded under the supervision of guitarist Duncan Lloyd at the band's own studio in Newcastle towards the end of 2013, but recording initially started at the studio of Peter and David Brewis of Field Music. In an interview frontman Paul Smith described what the brothers brought to some of the tracks they worked on for the record:

The album also included production contributions from Dave Okumu from The Invisible and was mixed by Nicolas Vernhes who previously worked with Deerhunter on Monomania. B-sides from the album campaign include "A Vague Implication" (from "Leave This Island") and "When I'm Alone" (from "Midnight On The Hill").

An earlier, stripped-down version of "Is It True?" featured as a B-side to the single "Hips And Lips" from The National Health. During the album campaign for Too Much Information, a double A-side single, "Random Regrets / On The Sly", was released on 7-inch vinyl for Record Store Day 2014, consisting of two offcuts from the recording sessions for The National Health and Too Much Information respectively. An interesting feature of this release is that all copies pressed accidentally had the labels pressed onto the wrong sides of the record because of a factory error.

Critical reception

Too Much Information received positive reviews from critics upon release. At Alternative Press, Tim Karan rated the album three-and-a-half out of five stars, noting that "Although past Maxïmo Park records certainly exhibited diversity, they often sacrificed cohesion in the process; however, Too Much Information has just the right balance of depth, maturity and consistency to ensure success." The NME gave the album 7/10, praising the band's success against "anti-guitar gunfire".

Track listing
All lyrics by Paul Smith; all music by Duncan Lloyd, except where noted.

Deluxe edition Covers EP
 "Middlesbrough Man" (based on Edinburgh Man, originally by The Fall) - 4:00	
 "I'll Be Here in the Morning" (originally by Townes Van Zandt) - 3:02	
 "Lover, Lover, Lover" (originally by Leonard Cohen) - 3:29	
 "Northern Sky" (originally by Nick Drake) - 3:43	
 "Final Day" (originally by Young Marble Giants) - 2:00	
 "Fade Into You" (originally by Mazzy Star) - 4:34
 "On The Sly" (iTunes-only bonus track) - 3:25

Personnel
Maxïmo Park
Tom English – drums, percussion
Duncan Lloyd – electric guitar, backing vocals, bass guitar, keyboards
Paul Smith – lead vocals
Archis Tiku – bass guitar
Lukas Wooller – keyboards

References

2014 albums
Maxïmo Park albums
V2 Records albums